Reeds Mill is an unincorporated community in Jefferson County, in the U.S. state of Ohio.

History
A post office called Reeds Mills was established in 1879, and remained in operation until 1933. The namesake Reed's Mill was a gristmill operated by Joseph Reed on Cedar Lick.

References

Unincorporated communities in Jefferson County, Ohio
Unincorporated communities in Ohio